The 1981 Rutgers Scarlet Knights football team represented Rutgers University in the 1981 NCAA Division I-A football season. In their ninth season under head coach Frank R. Burns, the Scarlet Knights compiled a 5–6 record while competing as an independent and were outscored by their opponents 208 to 139. The team's statistical leaders included Ralph Leek with 926 passing yards, Albert Ray with 679 rushing yards, and Andrew Baker with 356 receiving yards.

Schedule

Roster

References

Rutgers
Rutgers Scarlet Knights football seasons
Rutgers Scarlet Knights football